Gardino Pellolio (born 11 June 1980 in Como) is an Italian rower.

References 

1980 births
Living people
Italian male rowers
Sportspeople from Como
World Rowing Championships medalists for Italy